Somatina is a genus of moths in the family Geometridae first described by Achille Guenée in 1858.

Description
The genus is similar to Problepsis, but differs in that the antennae of the male usually being ciliated. Forewings with vein 10 arising from veins 7, 8 and 9 anastomosing (fusing) with vein 11, and then with veins 8 and 9 to form a double areole.

Species
Somatina accraria Swinhoe, 1904
Somatina anthophilata Guenée, [1858]
Somatina apicipuncta Prout, 1915
Somatina centrofasciaria (Leech, 1897)
Somatina chalyboeata (Walker, 1869)
Somatina ctenophora Prout, 1915
Somatina densifasciaria Inoue, 1992
Somatina discata Warren, 1909
Somatina eurymitra Turner, 1926
Somatina figurata Warren, 1897
Somatina fletcheri Herbulot, 1958
Somatina fraus Prout, 1916
Somatina fungifera Warren, 1909
Somatina hombergi Herbulot, 1967
Somatina impunctulata (Warren, 1901)
Somatina ioscia Prout, 1932
Somatina irregularis (Warren, 1898)
Somatina lemairei Herbulot, 1978
Somatina lia Prout, 1915
Somatina macroanthophilata Xue, 1992
Somatina maeandrata Prout, 1925
Somatina mozambica (Thierry-Mieg, 1905)
Somatina nigridiscata (Warren, 1896)
Somatina obscuriciliata Wehrli, 1924
Somatina omicraria (Fabricius, 1798)
Somatina ossicolor Warren, 1898
Somatina plynusaria (Walker, [1863])
Somatina postlineata (Warren, 1899)
Somatina probleptica Prout, 1917
Somatina prouti Janse, 1934
Somatina purpurascens Moore, [1887]
Somatina pythiaria (Guenée, [1858])
Somatina rhodochila Prout, 1932
Somatina rosacea Swinhoe, 1894
Somatina rufifascia Warren, 1896
Somatina sanctithomae Herbulot, 1958
Somatina sedata Prout, 1922
Somatina sublucens (Warren, 1907)
Somatina subviridata (Warren, 1901)
Somatina syneorus Prout, 1915
Somatina transvehens Prout, 1918
Somatina vestalis (Butler, 1875)
Somatina virginalis Prout, 1917
Somatina wiltshirei Prout, 1938

References

External links

Scopulini